The 1916 Cleveland Indians season was their first season in existence. The team played in the Ohio League and would go on to post an 8-3-1 record.

Schedule

Game notes

References
Pro Football Archives: 1916 Cleveland Indians season

Cleveland Indians (NFL) seasons
Cleveland Tig
Cleveland Tig